Freedom Tower was an early proposed name for One World Trade Center, a skyscraper in New York City.

Freedom Tower may also refer to:
Freedom Tower (Miami)
Azadi Tower or Freedom Tower, a building in Tehran, Iran
 Freedom Tower on Hickam Air Force Base, Hawaii

See also 
Freedom Center (disambiguation)